Montaigu-Vendée is a commune in the Vendée department in the Pays de la Loire region in western France. The municipality was established on January 1, 2019 by the merger of the communes of Boufféré, La Guyonnière, Montaigu, Saint-Georges-de-Montaigu and Saint-Hilaire-de-Loulay.

Population

See also
Communes of the Vendée department

References

External links

Communes of Vendée
2019 establishments in France
States and territories established in 2019